Aglaurus or Agraulus is a name attributed to three figures in Greek mythology.

Aglaurus, an Athenian princess as the daughter of King Actaeus. She married Cecrops and became the mother of Erysichthon, Aglaurus (see below), Herse, and Pandrosus.
Aglaurus, also an Athenian princess as the daughter of Cecrops, who was driven to suicide for ignoring a warning from the goddess Athena.
Aglaurus, daughter of an incestuous relationship between Erectheus and his daughter Procris. Aglaurus is also known as Aglauros (most commonly), Aglaulos, Agraulus, Agravlos, or Agraulos. Agraulos ("countryside flute") was probably the original form of the name, with the r and l commonly switched to produce the prevalent Aglauros form.

Notes

References 
 Apollodorus, The Library with an English Translation by Sir James George Frazer, F.B.A., F.R.S. in 2 Volumes, Cambridge, MA, Harvard University Press; London, William Heinemann Ltd. 1921. ISBN 0-674-99135-4. Online version at the Perseus Digital Library.
 Bell, Robert E., Women of Classical Mythology: A Biographical Dictionary. ABC-Clio. 1991. .
 Gaius Julius Hyginus, Fabulae from The Myths of Hyginus, translated and edited by Mary Grant. University of Kansas Publications in Humanistic Studies. Online version at the Topos Text Project.
 Graves, Robert, The Greek Myths: The Complete and Definitive Edition. Penguin Books Limited. 2017. 
 Pausanias, Description of Greece with an English Translation by W.H.S. Jones, Litt.D., and H.A. Ormerod, M.A., in 4 Volumes. Cambridge, MA, Harvard University Press; London, William Heinemann Ltd. 1918. . Online version at the Perseus Digital Library.

Princesses in Greek mythology
Attican characters in Greek mythology